Scopula tosariensis is a moth of the  family Geometridae. It is found on Java.

References

Moths described in 1923
tosariensis
Moths of Indonesia